Amarildo may mean:

Amarildo (footballer, born 1939), full name Amarildo Tavares da Silveira, Brazilian football striker
Amarildo Belisha (born 1981), Albanian football defender
Amarildo Zela (born 1972), retired Albanian footballer
Amarildo (footballer, born 1964) (born 1964), full name Amarildo Souza do Amaral, Brazilian football striker
Amarildo Almeida (born 1976), Guinea-Bissauan sprinter
Amarildo (footballer, born 1976), full name Amarildo Luis Souza da Silva, Brazilian football midfielder
Amarildo (footballer, born 1999), full name Amarildo de Souza, Brazilian football forward